= Sondhia =

Rajput community of Central India

Sondhiya Rajput
Regions with significant populations
- Ajmer, Gwalior, Central India

Languages
- Hindi, Rajasthani

Religion
- Hinduism

Related ethnic groups
- Rajputs, Chauhan, Rathore, Sisodiya clans

Sondhiya rajput is Hindu caste found in the state of Rajasthan and Madhya Pradesh in India. They are descended from the Rajputs of Malwa, and have been living in Rajathan and Madhya Pradesh for 700 years.

Sondhiya Rajput (Hindi: सोंधिया राजपूत) are a Rajput community historically associated with the regions of Ajmer, Gwalior, and Central India. They trace their ancestry to the Chauhan, Rathore, and Sisodiya Rajput clans. The community is known for its martial traditions, cavalry skills, and active participation in regional warfare during the early nineteenth century.

== History and origin ==
They are a community of small farmers, although the community is now being urbanized. They are a Vaishnavite Hindu community, and have no particular customs. The Sondhia rajput are generally considered to belong to the OBC category.

== Etymology and Origin ==
The term Sondhiya (or Sondhwad) is believed to derive from the early settlements of the Sondhwad region, situated between parts of Rajasthan and Central India. According to genealogical and regional traditions, the Sondhiya Rajputs descend from the Rajput lineages of Marwar (Rathore), Ajmer (Chauhan), and Mewar (Sisodiya). (Note: From the Census of India, Kyasra section, Chapter II: People and Their Material Equipment, p. 8.)

== History ==
British PeriodThe Sondhiya Rajputs are mentioned in Sir John Malcolm’s work <A Memoir of Central India (1823)>, particularly in the context of the peace of Mandsaur. Malcolm described their cavalry as "well-armed, disciplined, and valorous", maintaining independent forts and military contingents in Central India.

Some colonial writers later labeled the community as of "mixed race", but these statements are regarded as biased and politically motivated, stemming from adversarial perspectives rather than authentic ethnographic sources.

The Census of India recorded the Sondhiya Rajputs among the landholding and warrior groups, primarily engaged in agriculture and military service.

== Historiographical Notes ==
Modern researchers consider early British descriptions of the Sondhiya community as products of colonial bias and political hostility. In contrast, regional records portray them as honour-bound Rajput warriors with strong traditions of independence, courage, and lineage purity.
